Krigia dandelion, known as potato dwarfdandelion, is a North American species of plants in the family Asteraceae. It is native to the southeastern and south-central United States, from the Florida Panhandle to Texas and north as far as Kansas, southern Illinois, and Maryland

Krigia dandelion is an perennial herb up to 50 cm (20 inches) tall. One plant generally produces one flower head per flower stalk, each head with 25–34 yellow or yellow-orange ray flowers but no disc flowers.

References

External links
Photo of herbarium specimen at Missouri Botanical Garden, collected in Missouri in 1988

Cichorieae
Flora of the Southeastern United States
Endemic flora of the United States
Plants described in 1753
Taxa named by Carl Linnaeus
Taxa named by Thomas Nuttall
Flora without expected TNC conservation status